Barnham railway station is a former station in Barnham, Suffolk on a now closed line between Thetford and Bury St Edmunds. It was located close to the Norfolk border.

History
The railway line between Bury St Edmunds and Thetford was proposed by the Bury St Edmunds and Thetford Railway (B&TR) and authorised on 5 July 1865; but the company had problems in raising the necessary money. The B&TR was purchased by the Great Eastern Railway (GER) in 1878.

Trains on the B&TR were operated by the T&WR until 1879, when operation was taken over by the GER; after this, trains from Bury began to run to Thetford; the east to south curve at Thetford Bridge was not used after 1880. Thetford Bridge was then the last station before .

References

External links 
 Barnham station on navigable 1946 O. S. map

Disused railway stations in Suffolk
Former Great Eastern Railway stations
Railway stations in Great Britain opened in 1876
Railway stations in Great Britain closed in 1953
Borough of St Edmundsbury